Bruce Gilbert Murray (23 February 1933 – 30 January 1981) was an Australian rules footballer who played with Geelong and St Kilda in the Victorian Football League (VFL).

Notes

External links 

1933 births
1981 deaths
Australian rules footballers from Victoria (Australia)
Geelong Football Club players
St Kilda Football Club players
Camperdown Football Club players